Blank Generation is a 1980 American-produced music film. It was directed and co-written by Ulli Lommel, and it stars Carole Bouquet as the French journalist Nada and Richard Hell.

Cast
Carole Bouquet as Nada
Richard Hell as Billy
Ulli Lommel as Hoffritz
Suzanna Love as Lizzy
Howard Grant as Jack
Ben Weiner as Kellerman
Andy Warhol as Himself
Robert Madero as Harry
Bill Mirring as Jonathan Marlowe
David Pirrock as Bobby Butler
J. Frank Butler as Bobby's Father
Ivan Julian as member of the Voidoids
Robert Quine as member of the Voidoids	
Mark Bell as member of the Voidoids
Walter Steading as a violin player

Soundtrack
Acclaimed composer Elliot Goldenthal composed music for the film.

All songs were written by Richard Hell and performed by Richard Hell and the Voidoids.

References

External links

1980 films
Films set in New York City
Films directed by Ulli Lommel
American musical films
Films scored by Elliot Goldenthal
1980s musical films
1980s English-language films
1980s American films